Boyd Lucassen (born 1 July 1998) is a Dutch footballer who plays as a right-back for Eerste Divisie club NAC Breda.

Club career
Born in Doetinchem, Lucassen played for Vitesse at youth level before making his debut for their reserve team in 2016. On 20 June 2019, Lucassen joined Eerste Divisie club Go Ahead Eagles on a two-year contract with the option for a further season. He made his debut for Go Ahead Eagles on 18 October 2019, coming on as an 87th-minute substitute in a 3–0 victory at home to FC Volendam.

On 10 May 2022, Lucassen signed a three-year contract with NAC Breda.

References

External links
 Career stats & profile - Voetbal International
 

1998 births
Living people
Dutch footballers
Association football fullbacks
People from Doetinchem
Footballers from Gelderland
Go Ahead Eagles players
SBV Vitesse players
NAC Breda players
Eredivisie players
Eerste Divisie players
20th-century Dutch people
21st-century Dutch people